Jeffrey Harold West (born April 6, 1953) is a former National Football League punter and tight end from (1975-1985) for three teams.

References 

1953 births
Living people
Sportspeople from Wheeling, West Virginia
Players of American football from West Virginia
American football punters
Cincinnati Bearcats football players
St. Louis Cardinals (football) players
San Diego Chargers players
Seattle Seahawks players
Sportspeople from Redmond, Washington